Dave Ryan is an Irish professional rugby union player, currently playing for SU Agen in the French Top 14. Ryan plays as a prop. He previously played for Dolphin, Munster, Zebre and Lazio.

Ryan played for Munster between 2009 and 2010 after being promoted from a development contract.

It was announced in Spring 2011 that Ryan was leaving Munster to join Lazio Roma in Italy. He moved to Zebre for the 2012–13 season.

In April 2014, it was announced that he would join Ulster on a 2-year deal from the 2014–15 season.

Ryan was included in the USA preliminary squad for the summer tests during 2012, being eligible through his American mother, but turned down the chance as to continue playing professionally in Italy.

References

External links
Munster Profile

1986 births
Living people
Munster Rugby players
American rugby union players
Rugby union props
Rugby union players from Cork (city)
Alumni of Cork Institute of Technology
Zebre Parma players
American expatriate rugby union players
Expatriate rugby union players in Italy
American expatriate sportspeople in Italy
Ulster Rugby players
Irish people of American descent
Irish rugby union players
Irish expatriate sportspeople in Italy
Irish expatriate rugby union players
American expatriate sportspeople in France
Irish expatriate sportspeople in France
SU Agen Lot-et-Garonne players
Expatriate rugby union players in France
S.S. Lazio Rugby 1927 players